Tiziana Lodato (born 10 November 1976) is an Italian film, stage and television actress.

Life and career 
Born in Catania, Lodato attended the Istituto d'Arte in her hometown, and at young age she debuted on stage at the Teatro Stabile di Catania.

She made her film debut in 1995, with the main female role in Giuseppe Tornatore's The Star Maker. After finishing her studies, she moved to Rome where she continued her acting career in films, television and on stage. She is married to a pharmaceutical executive since 2005 and has a son.

References

External links 
 

Italian film actresses
Italian television actresses
Italian stage actresses
1976 births
Actors from Catania
Living people
20th-century Italian actresses
21st-century Italian actresses